In Mexica mythology, the Centzon Tōtōchtin ( "four-hundred rabbits"; also Centzontōtōchtin) are a group of divine rabbits who meet for frequent drunken parties. They include Tepoztecatl, Texcatzonatl, Colhuatzincatl, Macuiltochtli ("five-rabbit"), and Ometochtli ("two-rabbit"). Their parents are Patecatl and Mayahuel and they may be brothers of Ixtlilton.

References

Bibliography

  
 
  
 
 

Aztec pulque gods
Mythological rabbits and hares
Alcohol deities